Yaşam Göksu (born September 25, 1995) is a Turkish female football defender, who plays in the Turkish Women's Football Super League for Fenerbahçe. She has been part of the Turkey women's national football teams since 2010.

Private life
Yaşam Göksu was born in Konak district of Izmir, Turkey on September 25, 1995. She has two elder brothers.

Playing career

Club

Yaşam Göksu obtained her license on March 2, 2007, and was admitted to the Konak Belediyespor club in her hometown. Already in the 2008–09 season, she became part of the team competing in the Women's First League. As of the 2013–14 season, she capped 110 times and scored 10 goals for Konak Belediyespor. During this period, she enjoyed two consecutive champion titles, in the 2012–13 and 2013–14 season with her club.

Debuting in the match against FC NSA Sofia on August 8, 2013, she appeared in seven matches of the 2013–14 UEFA Women's Champions League, at which her team advanced to the  Round of 16.

In the 2015–16 season, she transferred to 1207 Antalya Muratpaşa Belediye Spor.

After two seasons with 1207 Antayaspor, Göksu returned to her gormer club Konak Belediyespor in the 2017–18 season.

In October 2018, she joined the Gaziantep-based club ALG Spor, which were promoted to the Women's First League in the 2018–19 season. The next season, she returned to her hometown club Konak Belediyespor.

On 22 January 2021, she moved to Spain, and joined the Lleida-based club SE AEM to play in the n the Women's Segunda División Pro of Spain.

For the 2021-22 Turkcell Super League season, she returned home to play in her former club Konak Belediyespor.

International

Göksu became international playing for the Turkey Girls' U-15 national team in the 2010 Summer Youth Olympics qualifying round match against Georgia on October 12, 2009. She capped two times for the Turkey U-15 team.

Debuting in the match against the girls from England on October 3, 2010, she was part of the Turkey girls' national U-17 team in the four matches of the 2010 Summer Youth Olympics – Girls' tournament in Singapore, at which Turkey took the bronze medal. She played in all three matches of the 2011 UEFA Women's Under-17 Championship – Group 6 round. She capped 8 times in total for the Turkey U-17 team and scored two goals.

She appeared for the Turkey U-19 team playing in two games of the 2012 UEFA Women's Under-19 Championship – Group A round. Later, she took part at two matches of the 2013 UEFA Women's U-19 Championship First qualifying round – Group 5 scoring two goals, three matches of the 2014 UEFA Women's Under-19 Championship First qualifying round – Group 10, and three games of the 2014 UEFA Women's Under-19 Championship Second qualifying round – Group 5 competitions.

On May 7, 2014, Yaşam Göksu debuted at the 2015 FIFA Women's World Cup qualification – UEFA Group 6 match playing for the Turkey women's national team against Belarus on May 7, 2015. After five years, she was called up again to the national team to play at the UEFA Women's Euro 2022 qualifying Group A matches.

Career statistics
.

Honours 
 Turkish Women's First League
 Konak Belediyespor
 Winners (3): 2012–13, 2013–14, 2014–15
 Runners-up (1): 2010–11
 Third places (3): 2009–10, 2017–18, 2019–20

 ALG Spor
Runners-up (1): 2018–19

References

External links

 

1995 births
Living people
People from Konak
Footballers from İzmir
Turkish women's footballers
Women's association football defenders
Turkey women's international footballers
Footballers at the 2010 Summer Youth Olympics
Turkish expatriate women's footballers
Turkish expatriate sportspeople in Spain
Expatriate women's footballers in Spain
1207 Antalya Spor players
Konak Belediyespor players
ALG Spor players
Fenerbahçe S.K. women's football players
Segunda Federación (women) players
Turkish Women's Football Super League players